Aron Pálmarsson (born 19 July 1990) is an Icelandic handball player for Aalborg Håndbold and the Icelandic national handball team.

Career
Aron played his first game for FH only aged 15 years old against ÍBV in March 2006. FH won the game 30–28 and the young player managed to score one goal.

In the season 2007/08 Aron was one of the key players when FH won the 1.deild and won promotion to úrvalsdeild. Aron scored 130 goals in 22 games.

The 2008/09 season was very successful for Aron. Aron scored 115 goals in 16 games. FH finished 5th in the league. He was voted the most promising player, the best offensive player and was selected in the team of the season. He was also selected in the Iceland men's national handball team.

After Aron was brought to Kiel, FH awarded him with their Golden award for his successful career with FH.

He gained attention while playing for FH before he transferred to German club THW Kiel.

On 29 December 2012 Aron won the award "Best athlete of the year 2012".

He played a major part in the Iceland squad that earned the bronze medal at the 2010 European championship in Austria.

Personal life
Aron's father is former basketball player Pálmar Sigurðsson who was named to the Icelandic basketball team of the 20th century by the Icelandic Basketball Association in 2001.

Honours

THW Kiel
Bundesliga: 2010, 2012, 2013, 2014, 2015
German Cup: 2011, 2012
DHB-Supercup: 2011
Champions League: 2010, 2012

MVM Veszprém KC
Nemzeti Bajnokság I: 2016, 2017
Magyar Kupa: 2016, 2017
SEHA League: 2016

FC Barcelona
Copa ASOBAL: 2018, 2019, 2020, 2021
Supercopa ASOBAL: 2018, 2019, 2020, 2021
Liga ASOBAL: 2018, 2019, 2020, 2021
Copa del Rey de Balonmano: 2018, 2019, 2020, 2021
IHF Super Globe: 2018, 2019
EHF Champions League: 2021

Aalborg Håndbold
Danish Men's Handball Cup: 2021
Danish Super Cup: 2021, 2022

International
3rd place at 2010 European Championship

Individual
Selected Rookie of the year in Bundesliga 2010
Selected in 2012 Olympic Games All Star Team
Selected Sportsperson of the Year in Iceland 2012
MVP of the Champions League Final-Four: 2014
Awarded FH Gold Badge

References

External links

Aron Palmarsson
Living people
1990 births
Handball players at the 2012 Summer Olympics
Aron Palmarsson
Aron Palmarsson
Handball-Bundesliga players
Liga ASOBAL players
Expatriate handball players
Aron Palmarsson
Aron Palmarsson
Aron Palmarsson
THW Kiel players
Veszprém KC players
FC Barcelona Handbol players